John Nicholl (21 August 1797 – 27 January 1853) was a Welsh Member of the UK Parliament and was, for a very short time in 1835, a Lord Commissioner of the Treasury. His father was Sir John Nicholl, who like his son was a judge and politician.

Personal history
Born in 1797 to John Nicholl and Judy Birt, Nicholl was educated at Westminster and in 1816 obtained a place at Christ Church, Oxford. He took a first class in Classics before he achieved a Doctor of Civil Law degree in 1825, and was elected as an Advocate of the Doctors' Commons in 1826. In 1838, on the death of his father, he became the successor to the family estate, Merthyr Mawr House

Nicholl was married to Jane Harriet in 1821, daughter of Thomas Mansel Talbot and brother of Christopher Rice Mansel Talbot. They had seven children, and the family estate was inherited by his eldest son, John Cole Nicholl.

Political career
In 1832 Nicholl was elected to the House of Commons, winning the seat for Cardiff. On 14 March 1835 Nicholl was given the post as a Lords Commissioner of the Treasury, until 18 April the next year. Nicholl also held the post of Master of the Faculties, and in 1838 became Vicar-General of the Province of Canterbury, a post which was held by his father before him. Nicholl was appointed Judge Advocate General in 1841 when he was sworn of the Privy Council, and in 1846 he became a member of the Board of Trade. In 1852 he lost his Parliamentary seat to Walter Coffin.

References

External links 
 

1797 births
1853 deaths
Alumni of Christ Church, Oxford
Members of the Privy Council of Great Britain
Members of Doctors' Commons
Members of the Parliament of the United Kingdom for Cardiff constituencies
Members of the Parliament of the United Kingdom for English constituencies
Tory MPs (pre-1834)
UK MPs 1832–1835
UK MPs 1835–1837
UK MPs 1837–1841
UK MPs 1841–1847
UK MPs 1847–1852
Members of the Privy Council of the United Kingdom